Southorpe Paddock is a  Site of Special Scientific Interest south of Southorpe in Cambridgeshire. It is managed by the Wildlife Trust for Bedfordshire, Cambridgeshire and Northamptonshire.

This site is a rare example of unimproved grassland on the Jurassic limestone of eastern England. It has typical limestone plants such as purple milk-vetch and clustered bellflower. Mature hedgerows provide additional habitats for wildlife.

There is access from the road south from Southorpe.

References

Sites of Special Scientific Interest in Cambridgeshire
Wildlife Trust for Bedfordshire, Cambridgeshire and Northamptonshire reserves